The Lake Timiskaming kimberlite field is Canada's southernmost kimberlite field, located in Northeastern Ontario and western Quebec, Canada. It is within the Lake Timiskaming Structural Zone which contains over 50 kimberlite pipes, several of which are diamondiferous. The Lake Timiskaming kimberlite field formed about 147 million years ago when the North American Plate moved westward over the long-lived New England hotspot, also referred to as the Great Meteor hotspot.

See also
Volcanism of Canada
Volcanism of Eastern Canada
List of volcanoes in Canada
Victor Diamond Mine

References

Diatremes of Ontario
Volcanoes of Quebec
Jurassic volcanism
Landforms of Abitibi-Témiscamingue
Volcanic fields of Canada